João Batista da Silva (born 8 March 1955), known as Batista, is a former Brazilian footballer who played as a defensive midfielder. 

He competed in the men's tournament at the 1976 Summer Olympics and won a gold medal in football at the 1975 Pan American Games.

Club career
Throughout his club career, Batista played for several clubs, mainly[ in Brazil, but also in Italy and Portugal, namely: Internacional (1973–1981), Grêmio (1982), Palmeiras (1983), Lazio (1983–1985), Avellino (1985), Belenenses (1985–1987), and Avaí (1988–1989). During his time with Internacional, he won three Campeonato Brasileiro Série A titles, in 1975, 1976, and 1979.

International career
Batista competed in the men's tournament at the 1976 Summer Olympics, where Brazil finished in fourth place, and he also won a gold medal in football at the 1975 Pan American Games.

Batista won 38 senior international caps for Brazil from April 1978 to June 1983, but did not score a goal. He played also in two editions of the FIFA World Cup, in 1978 and 1982. In the 1978 tournament, Batista played throughout all seven of Brazil's matches, with the team not losing a single match, and only conceding three goals. Brazil failed to qualify for the final on goal difference, eventually finishing the tournament in third place.

In the 1982 World Cup, Batista was a reserve. He played once as a substitute for Zico, coming on in the final minutes of the team's second–round match against Argentina. Famously, Diego Maradona was sent off for his foul on Batista after Batista had flattened Juan Barbas.

He was also a member of the Brazil team that finished in third place at the 1979 Copa América.

Style of play
Batista usually played as a defensive midfielder, where he was known for his ability to aid his team defensively, but also had the capacity to help build attacking plays after winning back possession. However, he was also known for his lack of pace.

After retirement
Since retiring, Batista has been working as a commentator for Brazilian television channel RBS, which is part of the Globo TV circuit.

Clubs
 Internacional: 1973–1981.
 Grêmio: 1982.
 Palmeiras: 1983.
 Lazio: 1983–1985.
 Avellino: 1985.
 Belenenses: 1985–1987.
 Avaí: 1988–1989.

Honours

Club
Internacional
 Campeonato Gaúcho (4): 1975, 1976, 1978, 1981.
 Campeonato Brasileiro Série A (3): 1975, 1976, 1979.

Avaí
 Campeonato Catarinense: 1988.

Individual
 Bola de Prata: 1980, 1982.

References

External links
 
 
 
 
 
 

1955 births
Footballers from Porto Alegre
Living people
Brazilian footballers
Brazilian expatriate footballers
Association football midfielders
Campeonato Brasileiro Série A players
Serie A players
Primeira Liga players
Grêmio Foot-Ball Porto Alegrense players
Sport Club Internacional players
Sociedade Esportiva Palmeiras players
U.S. Avellino 1912 players
S.S. Lazio players
C.F. Os Belenenses players
Avaí FC players
Brazilian expatriate sportspeople in Italy
Brazilian expatriate sportspeople in Portugal
Expatriate footballers in Italy
Expatriate footballers in Portugal
Olympic footballers of Brazil
Footballers at the 1976 Summer Olympics
1978 FIFA World Cup players
1982 FIFA World Cup players
Brazil international footballers
Pan American Games gold medalists for Brazil
Pan American Games medalists in football
Footballers at the 1975 Pan American Games
Medalists at the 1975 Pan American Games